Vijay Seshadri (born 13 February 1954) is an American poet, essayist and literary critic based in Brooklyn

Vijay won the 2014 Pulitzer Prize for Poetry, for 3 Sections.

Early life
Vijay's parents immigrated to the United States from Bangalore, India when he was five. 
He grew up in Columbus, Ohio, where his father taught chemistry at Ohio State University.

Writing career
Seshadri has been an editor at The New Yorker, as well as an essayist and book reviewer in The New Yorker, The New York Times Book Review, The Threepenny Review, The American Scholar, and various literary quarterlies. 
He has received grants from the New York Foundation for the Arts, National Endowment for the Arts, the John Simon Guggenheim Memorial Foundation; and area studies fellowships from Columbia University. 
As a professor and chair in the undergraduate writing and MFA program at Sarah Lawrence College, he has taught courses on  'Non-Fiction Writing', 'Form and Feeling in Nonfiction Prose', 'Rational and Irrational Narrative', and 'Narrative Persuasion'.

In a 2004 interview, Seshadri discusses the creative process and his influences, in particular Walt Whitman, Emily Dickinson, Elizabeth Bishop, and William Blake. He also reflects on his cultural influences including the experience of "strangeness" coming of age in Columbus, Ohio during the 1960s.

Several of Seshadri's poems have been published by the New Yorker, including: "Rereading" (2012), "Visiting Paris" (2010), and "Thought Problem" (2009).

His poems, essays, and reviews have also appeared in A Public Space, AGNI, The American Scholar, Antaeus, Bomb, Boulevard, Epiphany, Fence, Field, Lumina, The Nation, The Paris Review, The Philadelphia Inquirer, Ploughshares, Poetry, The San Diego Reader, Shenandoah, The Southwest Review, The Threepenny Review, the Times Book Review, TriQuarterly, Verse, Western Humanities Review, The Yale Review. 

Anthologies which have included his work include Under 35: The New Generation of American Poets, Under the Rock Umbrella, Contours of the Heart, Staying Alive: Real Poems for Unreal Times and The Best American Poetry 1997, 2003, 2006, and 2013.

The Disappearances
Seshadri's poem "The Disappearances" deals with a "cataclysm" in "American history" and the baffling nature of loss. The poem was written in response to Seshdari's memories of John F. Kennedy's assassination, but not published until The New Yorker magazine printed it on its back page following the September 11 attacks. The New Yorker'''s poetry editor, Alice Quinn, said that the poem "...summoned up, with acute poignance, a typical American household and scene...The combination of epic sweep (including the quoted allusion to one of Emily Dickinson's Civil War masterpieces, from 1862) and piercing, evocative detail is characteristic of the contribution Seshadri has made to the American canon."

Awards
 2014 Pulitzer Prize for Poetry 
 The James Laughlin Prize of the Academy of American Poets (for "The Long Meadow")
 The Paris Review's Bernard F. Conners Long Poem Prize
 2004 Guggenheim Fellow

 Bibliography 

 Poetry 
Collections
 Wild Kingdom Graywolf Press: Minnesota, 1996, 
 The Long Meadow Graywolf Press: Minnesota, 2004, . His second book. Six of these poems were also published in the New Yorker including "The Disappearances," "North of Manhattan," and "The Long Meadow".
 New and Selected Poems'' by Harper Collins India. Includes 'Wild Kingdom', 'The Long Meadow', 'The Disappearances'.
 
 
List of poems

References

External links
 Poets.org webpage on Seshadri
 Poetry International Web page on Seshadri
 Vijay Seshadri 'The New Yorker Festival'

 

1954 births
Living people
20th-century American male writers
20th-century American poets
21st-century American male writers
21st-century American poets
American male writers of Indian descent
Columbia University alumni
Indian emigrants to the United States
The New Yorker people
Oberlin College alumni
Poets from Ohio
Pulitzer Prize for Poetry winners
Sarah Lawrence College faculty
Writers from Bangalore
Writers from Columbus, Ohio